Neurosporene is a carotenoid pigment.  It is an intermediate in the biosynthesis of lycopene and a variety of bacterial carotenoids.

References

Carotenoids